McComb can refer to:

 McComb (surname)

In Places:
 McComb, Mississippi
 McComb, Ohio (which was named for Alexander Macomb (American general)
 McComb (Amtrak station) in Mississippi
 McComb High School (Ohio)
 McComb School District in Mississippi